Vesper multinervatus, synonym Cymopterus multinervatus, is a species of flowering plant in the carrot family Apiaceae, known by the common name purplenerve springparsley. It is a perennial herb native to the southwestern United States, including the desert regions. It is stemless, producing leaves and inflorescence at ground level from a taproot. The leaves are erect on petioles of a few centimeters in length, with a fleshy blade dissected into waxy multilobed leaflets. The inflorescence arises on a stout purple or greenish peduncle up to about 14 centimeters tall. At the top is a rounded cluster of purple flowers sheathed in purple-veined bracts.

References

Mojave Desert Wildflowers, Jon Mark Stewart, 1998, pg. 178

External links
Jepson Manual Treatment
USDA Plants Profile
Photo gallery

Apiaceae
Flora of the California desert regions
Flora of Nevada
Endemic flora of the United States
Natural history of the Mojave Desert
North American desert flora